Red turtle may refer to:

 Red side-necked turtle, a species of turtle found in Colombia and possibly Peru and Brazil.
 Red-eared slider, the most popular pet turtle species in the United States and a popular pet turtle around the world.
 Red-faced turtle, a turtle found across much of northern Australia.
 Painted turtle, the most widespread native turtle of North America. Can have a red line on the top shell or a red pattern on the bottom shell.
 Red-crowned roofed turtle
 Red-necked pond turtle
 Red-bellied short-necked turtle
 Red-headed Amazon River turtle
 Pseudemys, a turtle genus, known as cooters with several red-bellied turtle species.
 Alabama red-bellied cooter
 Florida red-bellied cooter
 Northern red-bellied cooter
 The Red Turtle, 2016 animated film

See also

 Red-legged tortoise (disambiguation)
 

Animal common name disambiguation pages